Lauswolt is an estate in Beetsterzwaag, Friesland, the Netherlands, dating back to the 17th century. The estate is currently being used as a hotel. The restaurant, called De Heeren van Harinxma, had a Michelin star between 2001 and 2006 and has one as of 2022.

Lauswolt was the location of talks between CDA, the Labour Party and ChristianUnion for the formation of a new government. The negotiations were intended to be secret, but De Telegraaf newspaper revealed Lauswolt as the location on the very first day of the talks.

Buildings and structures in Friesland
Hotels in the Netherlands